Cole Creek is a stream in McKean County, Pennsylvania, in the United States.

History
Cole Creek was named for Squire Cole, a pioneer settler.

See also
List of rivers of Pennsylvania

References

Rivers of McKean County, Pennsylvania
Rivers of Pennsylvania